The Adventures of Sinbad 2 (Chinese: 辛巴达历险记2), also known as The Adventures of Sinbad 2014, is a 2014 Chinese animated adventure comedy film directed by Gu Peixin and Benpineko.

Cast
Yang Ou
Huang Ying
Yang Menglu
Xie Tiantian
Xia Lei

Box Office
The film has grossed US$3.82 million at the Chinese box office.

References

2014 films
2010s adventure comedy films
Films set in the 29th century
2014 animated films
Animated adventure films
Animated comedy films
Chinese animated films
2014 comedy films